The Toronto Varsity Blues Men's soccer is a Canadian intercollegiate soccer team founded in 1879 and now representing the University of Toronto. The program operates in the Ontario University Athletics conference of U Sports, and the team competes in the East Division of the OUA. The Varsity Blues play their home games at Varsity Stadium, a 4000-seat stadium situated in downtown Toronto on the University of Toronto-St. George Campus.

Throughout the team's history, the Varsity Blues have captured one National Championship in 1988. The 1988 National Championship team has since been inducted into the Varsity Blues Hall of Fame. The Varsity Blues won 49 provincial OUA Championships with the most recent one in 2010.

History

Beginnings (1884)

1880-84: Before the Committee 
The Varsity mentions as early as 1880, that the University College Associated Football Club is competing against Knox College, Collegiate Institute and the Medical School club teams. By the following year, the team was practicing regularly and travelling as far as Berlin (Kitchener, ON) for a tournament. While these early teams appeared to have practiced regularly on Front Campus, an actual organized club would not be formed until the spring of 1884.

1884: Association Football Committee 
The founding of this organized team can be traced to an Association Football Committee meeting on Tuesday, March 11, 1884, at 5 PM.

During the "well-attended" meeting a motion was put forward to set aside two days of the week for a "professional" team to practice. This team would be composed only of players selected by the committee.

One member opposed, arguing that it was "not desirable that the majority of the member [who won't be on the professional team] should sacrifice their [time] for the maintenance of this professional team". Another argued that this professional team should "practice on the prairie at the back of the University (referring to Back Campus) and leave the beautiful lawn for the rest of the members [who would not be on the varsity team]". The motion was passed and the Varsity team was formed, with the concession that all members will be allowed to train with the "professional" team during the two weekly practices.

The annual fee was raised to 50 cents and W.H. Irving was named as the President.

During the meeting, the club acknowledged member and player E.M. Hughes, who died recently from typhoid fever. The meeting also raised the need for the formation of an Inter-collegiate Association with the recommendation to include: Queen's College from Kingston, Victoria College from Cobourg, as well as Knox and University Colleges from Toronto.

1885-1890: The University of Toronto Athletic Association 
In the spring of 1885, the team was invited to Kingston, to play against Queens finishing the inaugural season with 6 wins and 2 draws with 14 goals forward and 2 goals against.

At the start of the next school year in the fall of 1885, the team had seven members who were also part of the Canadian International Football Club—and were in Newark, NJ competing.

In 1886, the Varsity Blues were to play Victoria College (then located in Cobourg) for the "Championship of Toronto," however the game was snowed out and a winner was never decided. At the end of that season, a letter-to-the-editor first appeared in the Varsity petitioning for the formation of an Athletic Association similar to that seen in McGill and Ottawa.

By fall 1887, the Varsity Blues had a regular First Eleven and Second Eleven playing regular games against Trinity Medical School and Toronto Medical School. There were still complaints that so few games were being played because of scarcity of teams in the area.

In the spring of that school year, a meeting was held between the representatives of the Rugby, Soccer, Basketball, Cricket clubs as well as the Gymnasium Association and Annual Sports Committee to unite them all under a single body: the Athletics Association. This association would charge $2 (later agreed to be $1) from each students' fees to be put toward general care of the lawn and other properties, as well as to act as final arbiters of conflict among the committees and support any of the clubs in times of financial troubles.

It wasn't until March 1891 that a draft constitution was put forth for the formation of the University of Toronto Athletic Association. This was readily supported by the soccer committee.

In that same season, the Varsity Blues defeated Grand Trunk Club of Montreal and were self-proclaimed "Champions of Canada," later travelling by train to Detroit and Chatham, and winning both those games 3–1.

Ernie Glass (1963–1968)

1963: A businessman named Ernie Glass 
In September 1963, Blues star-forward Bobby Lewis introduced a Toronto-businessman, named Ernie Glass, as the new head coach of the Blues. Glass had coached the Toronto City Reserve team and was a former player himself in Edinburgh, Scotland. He had ten returning Blues players that year, including top-scorer Keith Murphy, Jeff Mahon, Urs Maag, Bobby Lewis, Bill Troost and Peter Haynes. The Varsity Blues won the Blackwood Trophy after a 4–3 home-win and a 2–2 away draw against McGill but came up short in the Toronto & District Association championship with a 1–1 draw against McMaster near the end of the season, leaving them tied for second in the league standings. This was star-player's Bobby Lewis' last year as a Blue. He was invited on trial with Chelsea F.C. in England in March 1964 after the season ended and went on to attend graduate school in Wales.

1964: A thinking man's team 
In 1964, only 6 members had returned from the previous year's team. Among them were Pat Terrelonge, Bill Troost, Dom Dente and Nick Walker. Newcomers included future Varsity Blues soccer coach Jim Lefkos, Andy Pastor, "King" Ghartey and Austris Liepa. Coach Glass described the squad as a "thinking man's team" and the "youngest in a number of years". The Varsity Blues finished first in the regular season standings, capturing the Toronto & District Association trophy, going undefeated in the process. As for the Blackwood Trophy, the Varsity Blues and McGill Redmen were deemed co-winners after the final game ended 0-0, even after extra-time. Jim Lefkos led the team in scoring with 11 goals.

1965: The best college soccer team 
By the 1965 season, the league split into two divisions: Université de Montréal, McGill University and Queen's University in the East division and University of Toronto, University of Western Ontario, University of Guelph and McMaster University in the West division. Prior to the season, Glass said of his roster that he's "never seen so much talent in a group of college kids like this". There were nine returning players (Austris Liega, Dom Dente, Bill Troost, Pat Terrelonge) as well as rookies Ormond Mendes, Frank Soppelsa, and Bill Nepotiuk. Jim Lefkos was not a part of the 1965 team. In the middle of their undefeated season, University of Western Ontario coach Julius Payne said "Toronto has the best college soccer team I've ever seen outside of England". Toronto went undefeated in the West division and then retained the Blackwood Trophy on Nov 12, 1965 after defeating the East division winners, Queen's University, 6–1 in the final at Varsity Stadium.

1966: Blues keep rolling 
The following season saw the return of the same Blues roster with the exception of Terrelonge and Captain Dom Dente, who both graduated. Les Clarke joined the team from McGill, while Jim Kalman, Bert Halsall, and Frank Cappuccitti joined on as rookies. The Varsity Blues went undefeated in the 1966 West Division, only drawing 3–3 at home against Guelph on the Back Campus Field. They finished the regular season in first place, and defeated McGill University at home and away to capture the Blackwood Trophy for the third year in a row. At one practice Coach Glass told the Varsity newspaper, "that a team of Blues' calibre could achieve their record without a coach" while the Varsity Blues players knowingly smiled at one another as they ultimately knew Glass' role in their triumphs.

1967: Four in a row 
The University of Waterloo and Université Laval joined the West and East divisions, respectively. This increased the size of the league to five teams in the West and four in the East. As for Glass, his entire team had returned for another year. In addition, Jim Lefkos had rejoined the Varsity Blues after missing the previous two seasons, as well as rookies Ron Muir, John Gero and Jim Laverty. Glass said, during try-outs, said that "many good players are going to be cut this year...[as an] indication of how strong we are". In preseason exhibition, the Varsity Blues defeated a team of ex-Toronto City players 8-3— a team which included Bobby Nicol and Alan Harvey. Blues goalkeeper, Edwin Stach compared this Blues team to his former University of Western Ontario squad: "there is no comparison [ to his old team Western ]. At Western, we practiced only two nights per week while [in Toronto] we are out almost every day. Also, I'm sure if the coach at Western had the players that Blues cut this season, he would be mighty happy." Glass described his team as "at least top 20 in Ontario" and many of the more experience Varsity Blues players felt the team would finish at least mid-table in the Ontario National League — the semi-pro league.

The Varsity Blues won the East division with an 8-0-0 record including a home and an away win against McGill University. Lefkos and Soppelsa were the team's leading scorers for the year. On a cold and rainy Saturday afternoon at Varsity Stadium in front of "100 stoich fans", the Varsity Blues defeated the Queens' Golden Gaels — the undefeated team from the West division — 4–0 to retain the Blackwood Trophy for the fourth year in a row. Senior players Alan Cragg, Austris Liepa and Garth Rothwell all graduated at the end of the year.

1968: End of an era 
In what was to be Glass' final year at the helm of the team, the Varsity Blues had lost half their regular starters from the prior year. Returning to the fold were only Lefkos, Soppelsa, Sereda, Nepotiuk, Taylor and Gero. While Miles Sosa, Ken Cancellera, and goalkeeper Bernie D'Abreau were the crop of rookies. When speaking on his last four undefeated seasons, Glass said "I don't take much credit because these guys are good to start." He added that "while most university teams have 1 or 2 good players, the Varsity Blues are uniformly strong". The Varsity Blues started off the season with a string of exhibition losses. They lost 1-0 and 8–1 to the Toronto contingent of the Canadian World Cup squad, as well as 2–1 against the Toronto Emeralds of the Toronto & District League premier division. The four-year regular season unbeaten streak ended the following game when they lost the home-opener 4–3 to Guelph University. But, with the help of Jim Lefkos' 18 goals, the Varsity Blues won the six of the remaining seven regular season games to clinch the West division Championship and a berth in the OQAA final against Université de Montréal in Montreal.

After three feet of snow covered Montreal on the weekend of Nov 16, the game was almost cancelled. However "U of M officials changed their minds at the last moment, cleared the playing surface of all but six inches of the icey white stuff, painted field markings on the snow (in Blue no less) and the show went on." On a sunny Saturday afternoon, the Varsity Blues won the game 12–1, with Jim Lefkos scoring 6 and Soppelsa adding another three, capturing the Blackwood Trophy for a fifth straight time. Lefkos and star-defender and captain Eric Sereda shared the Charles Oster Trophy — symbolic of the team's Most Valuable Player as voted by the players. In December 1968, a The Varsity headline read "Soccer Title May Have Marked End of Era". The article contrasted the departing veterans to the new class of players: "the 'down and dirty' the night before and 'up and at em' the next morning veterans are almost all gone. The new 'milk and cookie' players are here. They have a tough act to follow". This was the last year that Blues won back-to-back OUA (OQAA at the time) titles.

Bob Nicol (1969–1980)

1969: The personable Bob Nicol 
The 1969 team lost seven regular starters, including Lefkos, Sereda, Nepotiuk, Taylor and D'Abreau. They also lost their coach, Ernie Glass, who stepped down to go on a football sabbatical in England. Bob Nicol, described as a "personable fellow", took over in his stead. Nicol had experience with the defunct Toronto Falcons and was at the time a player-coach with Ukraina of the semi-pro National League. In his first year with the Blues, his team consisted of Soppelsa, Gero, Cancellara, Kalman and Sosa as well as new players Trevor Wilson, Peter Mucalov, Andy Rode, John Cobby and Sam Cesario.

The Varsity Blues won all four exhibition games in the pre-season, including a 2–0 win against York. By October 25, they were still undefeated — tying three games and winning two — and were in a three-way tie for first place with only three games left. They won two of the remaining three games, and lost final one, 3–2 to McMaster Marauders. McMaster clinched the OQAA West division title. Gero led the Varsity Blues scoring with 10 goals. In a postseason article, The Varsity summarized the Blues' 1969 season: "[it is] unlikely that Toronto will ever dominate OQAA soccer the way it has in the past. All the teams in the Western circuit have improved rapidly".

1970: A season that aged like fine wine 
"Like good wine, the 1970 Soccer Blues improved with age" read The Varsity, after the 1970 season. In Nicol's second year in charge, there were only four returning veterans: Ken Cancellara, Miles Sosa, John Cobby and Ersin Ozerding. The rookies that year were Tony Bowker, Bruno Bruni, Ed Carter, Ken Franco, Mike Moores, Vito Polera, Mario Da Rosa, Dave Evans and Tony Lavelle. Followed by what was regarded as the team's "longest pre-season in their 45-year history", the Varsity Blues started off with a 4–4 draw at home vs Guelph. Three games into the eight-game season they had a win, a loss and a draw. "The season's turning point, came at Hamilton where the [eventual champions] Mac Marauders were grateful to obtain a late equalizing tally after the Varsity Blues had put it all together for the first time" read The Varsity, describing the team's improvement in form midway through the year. After that the Blues, won two, drew one, and needed a win against the McMaster Marauders in the final game of the season. The Varsity Blues drew 1-1, and finished third. Mac went on to win the West division. Ozerding led the team with 7 goals, and captain John Cobby won team MVP.

At the end of the 1970, it was announced that next year's Blackwood Trophy winner would go on to represent the OQAA (now the OUA) in the first ever CIAU National Championships — playing the other Canadian intercollegiate division champions. In December 1970, an ad ran in The Varsity informing the student body that the "Blues are determined to regain [their past status as OUA champions]...to help accomplish this, the team will initiate an off-season training program this Saturday". Anyone interested in participating in the first ever Blues off-season training was asked to "meet in the main locker room of Hart House tomorrow at 10:00AM". Coach Nicol expected the loss of only one or two veterans for the following season.

1971: A new home called Varsity Stadium 
By the start of their third year under Nicol, the Varsity Blues had only lost 2 regular season games, but still had not won the West division title. The core of the team returned in 1971, including Ozerding, Cobby, Bruni, Polera and Cancellera. The rookies that year were Ian Wylie, Bob Cazzola, Herby Dubsky, Bernie McEvoy, Donato Cellucci, Joe Dattollico and Lou Donofrio and John Pickles, Andy Ranachin and Malcolm Brown. After winning a pre-season tournament in Oneonta, New York, the team beat the Waterloo Warriors in the season opener and then triumphed against Buffalo State in another exhibition game. The Buffalo media called the Varsity Blues the "Canadian Champions" — even though Memorial had won the CIAU Championship the year before. The Varsity Blues then tied Western before winning five straight times to clinch the West division title.

Their opponent in the OQAA final was Laurentian University, who had won the East division with 7 wins and only a single tie. The game was played at Varsity Stadium in early November "cold temperatures, rain and chill north wind". The Varsity Blues lost the Blackwood Trophy 3–2. Laurentian went on to represent the Ontario University Athletics against Alberta, Loyola University and the defending champions Memorial in the 1971 CIAU Championships. One Blue was so upset after the game, that "as the two sides left the pitch, [he] ran up to a linesman, spat in his face, and stole his signal flag". This was the first season where the Varsity Blues had played the entirety of their home schedule at Varsity Stadium — whereas in previous years home matches were on either Front Campus or Back Campus.

1972: First visit to the national championships 
The 1972 squad was a mix of old and new players: Mario Da Rosa, Vito Polera, Vince Ierullo, Bob Cazzola, Tim Burns, Joe Dattolico, Bruno Bruni as well as a Peter Hillier, Ian Harris, Eugene Konarsky, Ed Cortes and John Cobby. By 1972, the OUAA soccer East division included Ryerson, Queen's, York, Trent, Carleton while the West was made up of McMaster, Toronto, Waterloo, Western, Guelph, Laurentian and Brock. Captained by Cazzorla, the Varsity Blues opened the season with a 3–0 win against Waterloo at Varsity Stadium. After five games played, the Varsity Blues had won three and drawn two and had only allowed 2 goals against. Eight games in, they had six wins and two draws and still only 3 goals against. The crucial game against McMaster was played at Varsity Stadium — the winning team assured of the West division title. The Marauders had 40 goals forward, the most in the league, while the Varsity Blues had the least against. The Varsity Blues won 1–0. In the final weekend of the regular season, the Varsity Blues defeated Guelph and Laurentian to finish atop the West division table with a 9-0-2 (W-L-T) record and 31 goals for and 7 against. The following weekend, on a York University field described by The Varsity (newspaper) as just "rain and mud", the Varsity Blues defeated York in the OUAA final and clinched a Nationals semi-final berth against Alberta. The Varsity said that "even York's twelfth man on the field — a huge defensive puddle halfway between the York goal and the centre line — offered little aid [to York in limiting the 4-0 Blues lead]". 
In the Varsity Blues first ever appearance at CIAU Nationals, they were defeated 2-0 by the Alberta Golden Bears at York University. This was their first defeat of the season. The Toronto school newspaper mentioned that the Varsity Blues had a "their first flat day [of the season]" and that "Alberta deserved its victory". The Golden Bears would go on to win in the final and become the 1972 National Champions.

1973: Second best to the Voyageurs 
Looking to retain the OUAA title, the Varsity Blues had a large core of returning players: Captain Tim Burns, John Cobby, Vince Ierullo, Peter Hilier, Vito Polera, Carmen Marcanonio, Robert Judd, Bruno Bruni and Alenn Carmancio. The Varsity Blues lost previous year's leading goal-scorer Mario Da Rosa. After going scoreless in their first 270-minutes of exhibition and league games, Coach Nicol attributed this to it being the "first year in many that a goal scorer of Da Rosa's [big and strong] mould is lacking". After a 1–0 home-opener loss to Mac, and then a 1–1 tie against Guelph, the Varsity Blues would win the next seven of nine games, tying two (both against the eventual champions Laurentian Voyageurs), and losing none. Trailing behind Laurentian Voyageurs in the West Division standings, their birth to the 1973 OUAA Final hinged on a win against McMaster University in the last game of the regular season. The Varsity Blues were up 1–0 with fifteen minutes to go. The Varsity describes the turning point of the game: "a hopeful and innocuous high [McMaster] lob down the middle caused the damage. Ignoring [Blues goalkeeper] Judd's call to leave it [Blues defender] Burns sought instead to nod the ball back towards [Judd]…[and past him]…the McMaster centre forward was left with the easy task of converting the goal." The Varsity Blues were unable to add another goal and the game finished 1-1. The Laurentian Voyageurs won the West division and the OUAA Championship — while Loyola College (now Concordia University) won the 1972 CIAU National Championship. Striker Vince Ierullo and goalkeeper Bob Judd shared the Charles E. Oster Trophy (the team's MVP as voted by the players).

1974: Ineligible players to start the season 
The start of the 1974 season had five of the Blues' starting players — including goalkeeper Jack Brand, defender Tim Burns as well as captain Geoff Crewe — OUAA eligibility challenged because of their participation in the North American Soccer League over the summer. Only Crewe was eventually allowed to play. Rounding out the team that year were newcomers Yannis Vassiliou, Mike Hendrickes, Rudi Kovacko, Bern Lecerf, Mike Lloyd, Ian McCluskey, Jude Robinson, Igor Ivanisevic and Ivan Perusco as well as returning players: Vince Ierullo, Dave Evans, and Phil Oldfield. The Varsity Blues defeated the eventual champions McMaster in their season-opener. Six games into the season the Varsity Blues were in first place, with four wins, a loss and a tie. The Varsity Blues would go on to lose the next four games, including a home loss and an away loss against Western as well as a 4–1 defeat versus Waterloo at Varsity Stadium. After the Waterloo game, The Varsity summarized the reasoning behind the Varsity Blues poor performance thus far: "[since] the average calibre of play throughout the league has continued to rise over the years, it was perhaps inevitable that any Blues team containing less talent than its predecessors would be hard put to maintain [the Blues] traditional high standing. For various reasons, this year's squad has [very few] players of superior ability".

In the final game of the season, the Varsity Blues defeated the new Western Division champions McMaster, 5–2 in Hamilton. McMaster would go on to win the OUAA, then lose both games at CIAU Nationals. Crewe was awarded the Charles E Oster Trophy while Vassiliou was the team's leading scorer. The team's Year-in-Review looked forward to 1975: "With only two players scheduled not to return next year, the club can mature into a more resilient team given the right attitude and fewer injuries. Conceivably, if the four players who were ruled ineligible [this year] are reinstated next year, this mediocre season will be the last for a quite a while."

Head coaches

Seasons 
Note:

1. Past results, and statistics are provided since 2004 are courtesy of the OUA and OUA Archives

2. Awards and statistics prior to 2004 are courtesy of the University of Toronto Archives

Team performances

Leading scorers 
Here are all-time leading scorers by season.

Award winners

Major national award winners – U Sports

These individuals have won major national awards.

Mario Kovacevic — 2014 U Sports Community Service Award
Mike Bialy — 2006 U Sports Player of the Year
Theo Zagar — 1997 U Sports Player of the Year
 Coz Zambazis — 1988 U Sports Championship MVP
Jim Lefkos — 1986 U Sports Coach of the Year

Major provincial award winners – OUA East

These individuals have won major provincial awards.

OUA Coach of the Year Winners Prior to 2004:

 2003 - John Vidovich 
 2001 - Jim Lefkos
 1993 - Jim Lefkos
 1988 - Jim Lefkos
 1986 - Jim Lefkos (co-winner)

OUA Most Valuable Players Prior to 2004:

 2003 - Robert Rupf

OUA Rookie of the Year Prior to 2004:

 2002 - George Davis 
 2001 - Sean Myers

Minor award winners – OUA East and U Sports

Notable alumni 
 Oladapo Afolayan –  English footballer – Bolton Wanderers
 Kilian Elkinson –  Bermudan national team player (formerly with Toronto FC)
 Lukas MacNaughton — Canadian Premier League player — Pacific FC
 Chris Mannella – Canadian Premier League player with Atletico Ottawa (formerly with Toronto FC, Ottawa Fury and York9)
 Anthony Capotosto — Toronto FC Academy director
 Carmine Isacco  — York 9 FC First-Assistant Coach
 Gabe Gala - former MLS player with Toronto FC
 John Smits - former NASL goalkeeper with FC Edmonton, NASL Golden Glove Award winner
 Theo Zagar - former goalkeeper for the Toronto Lynx

References 

men's soccer
U Sports teams
U Sports soccer
University of Toronto
Sports teams in Toronto